Joseph Morrison Skelly is Professor of History at the College of Mount Saint Vincent in Riverdale, New York.

Early life and education
His education includes a B.A. from the University of Notre Dame and an M.A. and Ph.D. from University College Dublin. He has published numerous books, including Political Islam from Muhammad to Ahmadinejad: Defenders, Detractors, and Definitions, the volume Ideas Matter: Essays in Honor of Conor Cruise O'Brien, and Irish Diplomacy at the United Nations, 1945-65: National Interests and the International Order.

Career
He has written articles for scholarly journals in North America, Europe, and Israel on a wide range of topics, including international terrorism, radical Islam, military affairs, and diplomatic history. He has written on similar themes for The Washington Times, National Review Online, United Press International, Irish Independent, and the Belfast Telegraph. He is treasurer of the Association for the Study of the Middle East and Africa and an associate scholar with the Middle East Forum. Previously, he was an Academic Fellow with the Foundation for the Defense of Democracies. Dr. Skelly is an officer in the United States Army Reserve. He completed a tour of duty in Operation Iraqi Freedom, where he was awarded the Bronze Star and the Combat Action Badge.

References
 College of Mount Saint Vincent: Official Biography & Bibliography

External links
 Foundation for Defense of Democracy
 

Year of birth missing (living people)
Living people
Roman Catholic writers
University of Notre Dame alumni
Alumni of University College Dublin
United States Army personnel of the Iraq War
National Review people
21st-century American historians
21st-century American male writers
United States Army officers
United States Army reservists
American male non-fiction writers